Joseph Alan Rudnick (born 1944) is an American physicist and Professor in the Department of Physics and Astronomy at UCLA.  Joseph Rudnick currently serves as the Senior Dean of the UCLA College of Letters and Science and Dean of the Division of Physical Sciences. He previously served as the Chair of the Department of Physics and Astronomy.  His research interests include condensed-matter physics, statistical mechanics, and biological physics.

References

External links
 Joseph Rudnick's web page at UCLA

1944 births
Living people
21st-century American physicists
University of California, Los Angeles faculty
Date of death missing